This is a List of Hindu temples in Trinidad and Tobago.

Temples 
 Alligator Street Shiv Mandir - Alligator Street, Munroe Road, Cunupia Trinidad 
 Amar Jyot Krishna Mandir - First Street, Five Rivers, Arouca 
 Amarjyoti Sabha Mandir - 264 Southern Main Road, Cunupia 
 Aum Shanti Ashram - Ackwah Road, Cunjal Road 
 Bamboo #2 Shiv Mandir - Bamboo Main Road, Bamboo Grove Settlement No. 2 
 Bandee Devi Ashram - #860 Cipero Road, Borde Narve Village, Princes Town
 Barataria Vishnu Mandir - Ninth Street, Barataria 
 Barrackpore United Hindu Sabha - Congo Hill Road, Barrackpore
 Bharatiya Vidya Sansthhaan - Adesh Ashram, Oudai Street, Aranguez 
 Blue Star Trinidad and Tobago - 39 Bandoo Street, Union Village, Claxton Bay  
 Bonne Aventure Hindu Temple - Parforce Street, Gasparillo
 Brickfield Shiv Mandir - Brickfield Village, Waterloo Road, Carapichaima 
 Bronte Hindu Mandir - Sugar Road, Bronte Village. Princes Town 
 Cap-De-Ville Hindu Temple - 19 Ramdhanie Street, Cap-De-Ville, Point Fortin 
 Carapo Shiv Mandir - O'Meara Road, Carapo 
 Chaguanas Hindu Temple - Corner Cumberbatch Street & Chaguanas Main Road, Chaguanas 
 Chandrashekhar Vishnu Mandir - Naparima Mayaro Road, Rio Claro 
 Charlieville Shiv Mandir - Caroni Savannah Road, Charlieville, Chaguanas 
 Chinmaya Ashram - #1 Swami Chinmayananda Drive, Calcutta Road #1, Mc Bean, Couva  
 Churkoo Village Mandir - 153 Manahambre Road, Churkoo Village 
 Craignish Shiva Mandir - Naparima Mayaro Road, Princes Town 
 Dharma Prakash Sabha Vyas Hindu Complex & Devi Mandir - 122 Caroni Savannah Road, Charlieville, Chaguanas
Divya Jeewan Hindu Mandir - Sou Sou Lands , Penal
 Doon Pundit Shiv Mandir - Temple Street, Arima
 Easwaramma Sai Centre - 4¼ Mile Clarke Road, Penal 
 Edinburgh Hindu Temple - Southern Main Road, Chaguanas 
 El Dorado Shiv Mandir - Caura Royal Road, El Dorado 
 El Socorro Hindu Mandir - El Socorro Road, El Socorro 
 Esperance Vishnu Mandir - Derrick Road, Esperance 
 Exchange Shiv Mandir - Brickfield Road off Exchange Estate Road, Couva 
 Ganesh Mandir - Corner Fernando Lane & Jonathan Trace, Esmeralda, Cunupia 
 Golconda Shiv Mandir 
 Hanuman Milan Mandir - Penal Rock Road, Sadhoowa
 Hari Mandir - Back Street, Tunapuna 
 Hindu Prachar Kendra - Galibia Drive, Ragoonanan Road, Esmeralda 
 Hindu Swayamsevak Sangh - Rio Claro 
 Hindu Vision Society - 54 Ariapita Avenue, Woodbrook
 Hindu Youth Organization - PO Box 3508, La Romain Post Office, La Romain
 ISKCON South Centre - Orion Drive, Debe 
 ISKCON Sri Sri Nitai Gauranga Mandir - Eastern Main Road, Garden Village, Arouca 
 ISKCON Sri Sri Radha Gopinath Mandir - Edinburgh Rd, Longdenville 
 Kabir Chowra Math - Mulchan Trace, Penal Rock Road
 Kailash Hindu Mandir - Eastern Main Road, Sangre Chiquito
 Kailash Mandir - 10b Gonzales Circular Road, Temple Street, Belmont 
 Kasheenath Mandir - Siparia Old Road, Fyzabad 
 Krishna Rama Mandir - #515 Guaracara Road, Williamsville
 Lachoos Road Shiv Mandir - #294 Lachoos Road, Penal 
 La Gloria Radha Krishna Mandir - La Gloria Settlement, New Grant 
 Lakshmi Narayan Bhakti Mandali - Corner Churchill Roosevelt Highway and Pasea Extension, Tunapuna 
 Lakshmi Narayan Mandir - LP 112 Siewdass Road, Freeport, Chaguanas 
 Lakshmi Narayana Pranava Mandir - Beaucarro
 Maha Rani Bhawani Maa Shakti Mandir - Pentecostal Street, Tunapuna 
 Malick Temple - San Juan
 McBean Hindu Mandir - Southern Main Road, Couva 
 Munroe Road Hindu Temple - Munroe Road, Munroe Settlement, Chaguanas 
 Naag Devta Shakti Shrine - Boundary Road Extension, Aranguez, San Juan
 Navet Shiva Mandir - #468 Cunapo Southern Main Road, Navet Village, Rio Claro 
 Palmiste Hindu Temple - Thompson Road, Palmiste, Chaguanas 
 Pandit Parasram School of Hinduism 
 Panduranga Vitthala Mandir - Seemungal Branch Trace, Mulchan Road, Penal Rock Road, Penal 
Param Dhaama Aashrama - Lachoos Road, Penal 
 Patiram Trace Shiva Lingam Mandir - Patiram Trace, Penal 
 Penal Rock Hindu Organization - 3¾ Mile Mark, Penal Rock Road, Penal 
Petite Morne Krishna Mandir - Petite Morne Settlement, Ste. Madeliene 
 Pierre Road Maha Milan Mandir - Corner of Pierre Road & Connector Road, Charlieville, Chaguanas
 Plaisance Park Hindu Temple - Petra Avenue, Plaisance Park 
 Point Fortin  Durga Shakti Mandir  Durga Shakti Temple - Dam Road, Point Fortin
 Point Fortin Hindu Mandir - Guapo Cap-De-Ville Road, Point Fortin 
 Radha Krishna Mandir - Gandhi Village, Debe 
 Rama Krishna Mandir - #257 Mohess Road, Debe
 Rama Krishna Mandir - Clarke Road, Penal 
 Reform Village Hindu Temple - Guaracara Tabaquite Rd, Gasparillo
 Sadhu Shakti Satsangh Mandir - Lawrence Hill, Digity Village, Barrackpore 
 Sant Nagar Hindu Temple - Corner of Ramoutar Street and Ojoe Road, Sangre Grande  
 Santa Flora Shiva Mandir - Pioneer Avenue, Santa Flora
 Satya Drishti Spiritual & Sporting Group - Rookmineah Trace South, Barrackpore 
 Scott's/Mendez Shiv Mandir - Scott's Road, Penal 
 SEVA - 18 Fletcher Road, Todds Road, Flanagin Town
 Shiv Durga Shakti Mandir - Korea Village, Carapichaima 
 Shiv Dvadas Jyortirling Mandir - Lower McBean, Couva 
 Shiv Shakti Temple - Neranthar Trace off Grant Trace, Rousillac
 Shiva Harijan Mandir - 31-35 Lalbeharry Trace, Debe 
 Shiva Jyoti Hindu Organization Trinidad and Tobago Incorporated - Las Lomas #1 
 Shree Divya Jyoti Mandir (The Mount Lambert Hindu Temple) - #13 Circular Road, Temple Street, Mount Lambert, San Juan 
 Shree Pavan Putra Hanuman Shiv Shakti Mandir - 20 Cunjal Road, Barrackpore
 Shree Raam Mandir Ayodhya Dhaam (formerly Endeavour Hindu Temple) - Rodney Road, Endeavour Village, Chaguanas 
 Shree Shankar Mandir - #139 Cacandee Road, Felicity, Chaguanas 
 Shri Bandi Hanuman Mandir - St.Mary’s Village, Moruga 
 Shri Murugan Foundation - Alta Garcia Trace, San Francique, Penal 
 Skanda Mata Shakti Kovil - #54b Duff Trace South, Lower Barrackpore 
 Spring Village Mandir - Couva Main Road, Balmain, Couva 
 Sri Dattatreya Yoga Centre (Trinidad and Tobago) - Datta Drive, Orange Field Road, Carapichaima  
 Sri Devi Maha Kaali Mandir - Joseph Cooper Trace, St Julien Village, Moruga
 Sri Govinda Maha Kali Mandir - Temple Road off Streatham Lodge Road, St. Augustine 
Sri Kali Amman Kovel- #9 Thomas Trace, Arouca
 Sri Mariamman Kali Koilou - #17 Golconda Settlement, Cross Crossing, San Fernando 
 Sri Sachchidananda Yoga Ashrama - 8A Rochard Road, Penal 
 Sri Siddhi Vinayaak Mandir SDMS Branch No. 221 - Siparia Old Road, Avocat
 Sri Sri Gopaul Krishna Ashram - Nolan Street, Felicity
 Suchit Trace Ganesh Mandir - Suchit Trace, Penal 
 Swaha Dharma Jyot Mandali - Naranjit Trace, Mondesir, South Oropouche
 Swaha Divya Ashram - 5a Mowlah Road, Preysal, Couva 
 Swaha Gyaan Deepak Kirtan Mandali - 19 Chotoo Street, Aranguez 
 Swaha Gyaan Jyoti Mandali- Wall Street, Madras Settlement
 Swaha Kashie Vishwanath Mandir - 1 km Penal Rock Road, Penal
 Swaha Longdenville Temple - Amaroosingh Street, Longdenville
 Swaha Om Shakti Mandali - Corner Coronation & Park Streets, Aranguez
 Swaha Shiv Shankar Mandir - Constance Street, Montrose, Chaguanas
 Swaha Sri Raam Dhaam - 92 Upper St. Lucien Road, Diego Martin 
 Swaha Sukh Shanti Bhakti Mandali - Warner Street, Freeman Road, St. Augustine
 Swaha Tulsi Manas Mandir - ¾ Mile Mark, Cunapo Southern Main Road, Sangre Grande
 Temple in the Sea - Waterloo, Couva
 Trinidad Sevashram Sangha - 32, Nolan Street, Felicity, Chaguanas
 Triveni Mandir - Sisters Road, Hardbargain  
 Upper Esmeralda Road Shiva Mandir - Esmeralda Road, Cunupia 
 Vishwanath Cultural Centre - #40 Cacandee Road, Felicity
 Vishwanath Hindu Social and Cultural Organization - 30¾ Mile Mark, Eastern Main Road, Sangre Chiquito 
 Penal Hindu Mandir

See also 
 Lists of Hindu temples by country

References 

Trinidad and Tobago
Hindu temples
Hinduism in Trinidad and Tobago
Hindu temples in Trinidad and Tobago